Baker's Head is a former hamlet in the Placentia District of the Canadian province of Newfoundland and Labrador.

See also
List of ghost towns in Newfoundland and Labrador

Ghost towns in Newfoundland and Labrador